Heidensee is a lake in Nordwestmecklenburg, Mecklenburg-Vorpommern, Germany. At an elevation of 37.8 m, its surface area is 0.24 km².

Lakes of Mecklenburg-Western Pomerania